The Gazette may refer to:

English-language newspapers

Botswana 
The Botswana Gazette, a daily newspaper published in Gaborone, Botswana

Canada 
Montreal Gazette, Montreal, Quebec, Canada

Newfoundland 
The Gazette (Newfoundland), the official newspaper of Memorial University of Newfoundland, in St. John's, Newfoundland

New Zealand 
New Zealand Gazette, the official publication of the New Zealand Government

United Kingdom 
The Belfast Gazette, the official publication of the United Kingdom for Northern Ireland
Eastbourne Gazette, Eastbourne, England, United Kingdom
The Edinburgh Gazette, the official publication of the United Kingdom for Scotland
The London Gazette, the official publication of the government of the United Kingdom
Teesside Gazette, formerly Evening Gazette, Teesside, England

United States 
Green Bay Press-Gazette, Green Bay, Wisconsin, United States
Hammonton Gazette, Hammonton, New Jersey, United States
The Gazette (Colorado Springs), Colorado Springs, Colorado, United States
The Gazette (Chicago), Chicago, Illinois, United States
The Gazette (Cedar Rapids), Cedar Rapids, Iowa, United States
The Gazette (Maryland), the common name of a group of community newspapers in the state of Maryland, United States
The Gazette (Stevens Point)
Maryland Gazette, known as The Gazette, founded in 1727 as The Maryland Gazette; one of the oldest newspapers in America
St. Joseph Gazette, St. Joseph, Missouri, United States
Pennsylvania Gazette, Philadelphia, Pennsylvania, published by Benjamin Franklin in the 18th century
Pittsburgh Post-Gazette, Pittsburgh, Pennsylvania, United States
Texarkana Gazette, Texarkana, Texas, United States
Hardwick Gazette, Hardwick, Vermont, United States: see Hardwick, Vermont#Media
The Gazette (Virginia), Galax, Virginia, United States.
The Charleston Gazette, Charleston, West Virginia, United States
Kalamazoo Gazette, Kalamazoo, Michigan, United States

Other 
The Gazette, a weekly newspaper for the Library of Congress library staff

Student newspapers
The Dalhousie Gazette, a student newspaper for Dalhousie University in Nova Scotia, Canada
UWO Gazette, a daily student newspaper for the University of Western Ontario in London, Ontario, Canada

French-language newspapers
La Gazette, a weekly magazine published in France from 1631 to 1915
La Gazette de Berlin, newspaper for the French-speaking community in Germany

Music
Country Gazette (band), an American bluegrass band
The Gazette (band), a Japanese rock band

Other
 Gazette journal,  (later International Communication Gazette)
 Gazette (TV series), a 1968 British drama
 The New York Gazette, a fictional newspaper in Rex Stout's Nero Wolfe mysteries

See also
The News-Gazette (disambiguation)